The Connaigre Bay Group is an Early Ediacaran group of volcanic strata cropping out in Newfoundland.

References

Ediacaran Newfoundland and Labrador